Waddepally Lake is a lake situated in Hanamkonda, Telangana. 

The lake serves as a reservoir for drinking needs Hanamkonda and Kazipet.

Tourist spot
The beautification work of the lake's bund is being developed to aim at attracting tourists to the place. it is also a best spot for fishing. and it is located near a shiva temple. govt of telangana recognised it and made it into a reservoir. now it pumps water for the city

References

Reservoirs in Telangana
Artificial lakes of India